Keppel is a ward in the Metropolitan Borough of Rotherham, South Yorkshire, England.  The ward contains 13 listed buildings that are recorded in the National Heritage List for England.   Of these, one is listed at Grade II*, the middle of the three grades, and the others are at Grade II, the lowest grade.  The ward contains the suburb of Kimberworth to the north of the centre of Rotherham, the village of Thorpe Hesley further to the north, and the surrounding area.  The listed buildings consist of houses and associated structures, farmhouses and farm buildings, churches, a commemorative column, a milepost, and a war memorial.


Key

Buildings

References

Citations

Sources

 

Lists of listed buildings in South Yorkshire
Buildings and structures in Rotherham